Hector Cameron may refer to:
 Hector Cameron (politician) (1832–1896), lawyer and political figure in Ontario, Canada
 Hector Cameron (moderator) (1924–1994), Free Church of Scotland minister
 Hector Charles Cameron (1878–1958), British physician and paediatrician
 Hector Clare Cameron (1843–1928), British surgeon